Pieter Dircksz. van Santvoort (1604–1635), was a Dutch Golden Age landscape painter.

He was born in Amsterdam and is known for landscapes in the manner of Esaias van de Velde.

He died in Amsterdam. He was the brother of the portrait painter Dirck van Santvoort.

References

Pieter Dircksz. van Santvoort on Artnet

1604 births
1635 deaths
Dutch Golden Age painters
Dutch male painters
Painters from Amsterdam